The Guandu River is a river of Rio de Janeiro state in southeastern Brazil. This river together with the Paraíba do Sul River are the most important in the Rio de Janeiro state.

The river supplies water to 9 million people in Greater Rio de Janeiro.
Many tributaries of the river rise in the  Mendanha State Park, created in 2013.
An aqueduct carries the water across the Pedra Branca State Park  to Rio's south zone.

Pollution
Guandu river is heavily polluted since it receives everything from raw sewage to industrial waste throughout its course.

The pollution problem is so serious that it threatens the water supply of the Rio de Janeiro metropolitan area. CEDAE, the water and sewer company of the state, recognizes that the problem is very serious. CEDAE also admits that because of the high levels of pollution, purification of Guandu's waters is a challenge.

See also
List of rivers of Rio de Janeiro

References
Brazilian Ministry of Transport

Rivers of Rio de Janeiro (state)